Loncopué is a second category municipality and capital of the Loncopué Department located in the Neuquén Province, Argentina.

History 
Loncopué was established on October 20, 1915.

Economy 
The major economic activities are animal husbandry of goats and sheep, and tourism.

References

 Patagonia.com.ar

Populated places in Neuquén Province
Cities in Argentina
Argentina
Neuquén Province